Neave's mouse (Mus neavei) is a species of rodent in the family Muridae.
It is found in Democratic Republic of the Congo, Mozambique, South Africa, Tanzania, Zambia, and Zimbabwe.
Its natural habitat is dry savanna.

References

Musser, G. G. and M. D. Carleton. 2005. Superfamily Muroidea. pp. 894–1531 in Mammal Species of the World a Taxonomic and Geographic Reference. D. E. Wilson and D. M. Reeder eds. Johns Hopkins University Press, Baltimore.

Mus (rodent)
Mammals described in 1910
Taxa named by Oldfield Thomas
Taxonomy articles created by Polbot